Batatara is a genus of moths in the family Lasiocampidae first described by Francis Walker in 1862.

References

Lasiocampidae